Holcocera nephalia is a moth in the  family Blastobasidae. It was described by Walsingham in 1912. It is found in Guatemala.

References

Natural History Museum Lepidoptera generic names catalog

nephalia
Moths described in 1912